= Rize 106.7FM =

Privately owned Nigerian radio station

Rize 106.7 FM is a privately owned Nigerian radio station located in Warri, Delta State.
